Shettihalli Church (referred to as Sathalli in colonial documents) is located 2km from Shettihalli, Hassan, in Karnataka. Built in the 1860s by the French missionaries in India, the church is a magnificent structure of Gothic Architecture. After the construction of the Hemavati Dam and Reservoir in 1960 the church was Submerged under water due to the dam It has since then become a famous tourist spot where people flock to see the half submerged church during monsoon. It is also known as The Submerged Church and The Floating Church.

History 

The Church was built in 1860 by the French missionaries for the wealthy British estate owners. In 1960 the construction of the Hemavati Dam and Reservoir led to the abandonment of the church. Since then the church submerges in water every year during monsoon season. It attracts a lot of tourists who visit the ruins to see this spectacular sight.

Visitation 
To enjoy the surreal beauty of Shettihalli church, one needs to travel to this place twice. Once in the month of July–October when it is partially submerged in water and next in the month of Dec–May when the water level recedes and the church grounds emerge. By road, the distance between Shettihalli and Bangalore is 200 km and can be easily accessed through roads. Buses are available as well which drop to Shettihalli Church. Trains frequent on a daily basis from Yashwantpur railway station to Hassan, Karnataka, which is the nearest town, approximately 40 km from Shettihalli.

Digitizing 
The church was digitized by creating a 3D model that is available to the public domain by axesmap. Viewers can experience the Shettihalli Church through virtual reality. Viewers can find it here.

Gallery

References

Churches in Karnataka
Church ruins in India
Buildings and structures in Hassan district
Tourist attractions in Hassan district
Submerged buildings and structures